John William Hetherington (1860 – 17 July 1929) was a miner and politician in Brisbane, Queensland, Australia. He was Mayor of Brisbane in 1910 and 1916-1917.

He was born in Brancepath, Durham, North England in 1860. In 1906 he was elected a member of the Brisbane City Council for Kangaroo Point, and he was three times Mayor of Brisbane, being appointed by the Governor-in-Council in 1910, and by his fellow aldermen in 1916 and 1917.

He was very involved in the mining industry: as a coal miner, coal merchant, inventor of safety equipment and in opening new coalfields.

References

Mayors and Lord Mayors of Brisbane
1860 births
1929 deaths